Edward Fernon (born 6 February 1988) is an Australian modern pentathlete. He competed at the 2012 Summer Olympics where he finished in 27th place. 

Fernon qualified to represent Australia at the 2020 Summer Olympics. He came twelfth in the riding (show jumping) but he was let down by his performance in the fencing, swimming and combined shooting/running events. Overall he came 31st.

References

External links
 

1988 births
Living people
Australian male modern pentathletes
Olympic modern pentathletes of Australia
Modern pentathletes at the 2012 Summer Olympics
Sportspeople from Sydney
Modern pentathletes at the 2020 Summer Olympics